The Gyro-Kopp-Ters Twin Eagle is an American autogyro, designed by Bob and Arden Kopp and produced by their company, Gyro-Kopp-Ters of Lake City, Florida.  The aircraft is supplied as a kit for amateur construction or as a complete ready-to-fly-aircraft.

Design and development
The Twin Eagle features a single main rotor, a two-seats-in tandem open cockpit with a windshield, tricycle landing gear with wheel pants and a four-cylinder, air-cooled, four-stroke,  Subaru EJ-22 automotive conversion engine in pusher configuration.

Standard equipment fitted includes a hydraulic pre-rotator and dual controls. The propeller used is a four bladed Powerfin composite, ground adjustable type with a  diameter.

The company estimates the assembly time from the supplied kit as 120 hours.

Operational history
By November 2017 two examples had been registered in the United States with the Federal Aviation Administration.

Specifications (Twin Eagle)

References

External links

Official photos

2000s United States sport aircraft
Homebuilt aircraft
Single-engined pusher autogyros